The History of Alexander, also known as Perì Aléxandron historíai, is a lost work by the late-fourth century BC Hellenistic historian Cleitarchus, covering the life and death of Alexander the Great. It survives today in around thirty fragments and is commonly known as The Vulgate, with the works based on it known as The Vulgate Tradition. These works consist primarily of that of Diodorus, the Bibliotheca historica, and Quintus Curtius Rufus, with his Historiae Alexandri Magni.

Completed at some point between 309 and 301 BC, it was the most popular work depicting Alexander in its time, but is valuable today for its unique perspective on the conqueror, in particular his psychological disposition and specifics of how the soldiers under him lived. Unfortunately, it is considered an unreliable source, with modern scholars considering Cleitarchus to have been more dedicated to writing an entertaining story than a reliable historical account. This dedication was also challenged by contemporary historians such as Arrian, who wrote his The Anabasis of Alexander in what is believed to be a deliberate attempt to counter Cleitarchus' "Vulgate Tradition", and in doing so created a work regarded by modern scholars as the best source on Alexander.

Origin
The work is believed to have been written in Alexandria, perhaps having been started when Ptolemy ordered the body of Alexander brought to Egypt, and finished between 309 and 301 BC. This dating is backed by the writings of several ancient historians, in particular through the works of the same Ptolemy, who it appears corrected Cleitarchus and whose works have been dated to the late fourth century, but this has been disputed in recent years following research into the Oxyrhynchus Papyri, which suggests that he instead lived and wrote in the mid-third century BC.

Vulgate Tradition
For much of antiquity Cleitarchus' work was the main secondary source that scholars wishing to create works about the Alexandrian Period utilized, resulting in a body of works described as in the Vulgate Tradition, with the work itself being referred to as The Vulgate. These notably include the works of Diodorus in his Bibliotheca historica, and Quintus Curtius Rufus with his Historiae Alexandri Magni, but also Sisenna and Justin (historian), alongside numerous less notable or otherwise forgotten figures.

The Vulgate Tradition itself is that of the popular narrative, typically critical of Alexander, in juxtaposition to the narratives presented in less critical accounts, such as those of Arrian. It has been criticized along with the History itself for dramatizing Alexander, focusing on the lurid details and negative aspects. Conversely, it has been commended for not whitewashing Alexander's life, and including these negative details that other historians have omitted.

Reception

Contemporary
While the History was a popular work in its day, it was challenged several times for its overly fanciful depiction of the life of Alexander, with Roman educator Quintilian describing him as an author with "more ability than trustworthiness", while the orator Cicero claimed that Cleitarchus' depiction of the death of Themistocles was entirely fictional, and in the Oxyrhynchus Papyri he is accused of being overly sensational in his work. Arrian, meanwhile, went so far as to create his own authoritative history on Alexander, in what is believed to be an attempt to challenge the Vulgate Tradition.

Despite this criticism, the work was used by other contemporary historians in the creation of their own work, including Diodorus and Curtius, but also Justin in his Historia Philippicae et Totius Mundi Origines et Terrae Situs, through the intermediator of Pompeius Trogus, and Plutarch, in his Life of Alexander.

Modern
Modern scholars tend to view the History with considerably distrust, preferring the work of Arrian, but the work of Cleitarchus is appreciated for its unique insights into certain aspects of the life of common soldiers and civilians under Alexander, as well as for a critical view that is lacking in other sources.

References

External links 
reconstruction of elements of the History, at alexanderstomb.com

Historiography of Alexander the Great
4th-century BC books
Lost books